The 2022 Rotorua mayoral election took place on 8 October 2022 to determine the Mayor of Rotorua. Incumbent mayor Steve Chadwick did not run for re-election.

Candidates

Declared candidates
Kalaadevi Ananda, businesswoman
Raj Kumar, district councillor
Reynold Macpherson, district councillor
Ben Sandford, lawyer, former winter Olympian, and Labour candidate in the 2017 general election
Fletcher Tabuteau, former New Zealand First MP
Tania Tapsell, district councillor and National candidate in the 2020 general election.

Declined to be candidates
Steve Chadwick, incumbent mayor
Dave Donaldson, deputy mayor
Todd McClay, National MP
Merepeka Raukawa-Tait, district councillor
Mercia Yates, district councillor

Results

References

Politics of the Bay of Plenty Region
Mayoral elections in New Zealand
Rotorua
October 2022 events in New Zealand